Pagani is a surname.  Notable people with the name include:

 Alberto Pagani (1938–2017), Italian Grand Prix motorcycle road racer
 Alessandro Pagani (born 1937), Italian Roman Catholic bishop
 Alfredo Pagani (1887–1984), Italian athlete 
 Angelo Pagani (born 1988), Italian cyclist
 Daniele Pagani (born 1966), Italian high jumper
 Fabrizio Pagani (born 1967), Italian economist 
 Gregorio Pagani (1558–1605), Italian painter of the late Mannerist period
 Herbert Pagani (1944–1988), Italian artist and musician
 Horacio Pagani (sportswriter) (born 1948), Argentine sportswriter and sportscaster
 Horacio Pagani (auto executive) (born 1955), Argentine founder of Pagani Automobili S.p.A.
 Lattanzio Pagani, Italian painter of the late-Renaissance or Mannerist period
 Maghinardo Pagani, Italian condottiero and statesman
 Maurizio Pagani (1936–2014), Italian engineer and politician
 Mauro Pagani (born 1946), Italian musician and singer
 Marcelo Pagani (born 1941), Argentine footballer
 Nello Pagani (1911–2003), Italian Grand Prix motorcycle road racer and Formula One driver
 Nicola Pagani (born 1977), Italian footballer
 Paolo Pagani (1655–1716), Italian Baroque/Mannerism painter
 Rémy Pagani (born 1954), Swiss politician
 Vincenzo Pagani (c. 1490–1568), Italian painter